Earp, California is an unincorporated community in San Bernardino County in the Sonoran Desert close to the California/Arizona state line at the Colorado River in Parker Valley.

The town, originally named Drennan in 1910, was renamed Earp in 1929. It was named for famed Old West lawman Wyatt Earp who with his common-law wife, Josephine Sarah Marcus, lived part-time in the area beginning in 1906. Earp staked more than 100 copper and gold mining claims near the base of the Whipple Mountains.

They bought a small cottage in nearby Vidal and lived there during the fall, winter and spring months of 1925 – 1928, while he worked his "Happy Days" mines in the Whipple Mountains a few miles north. It was the only permanent residence they owned the entire time they were married. They spent the winters of his last years working the claims but lived in Los Angeles during the summers, where Wyatt died on January 13, 1929.

Though the town was never incorporated, the post office near Earp's mining claims at the eastern terminus of Highway 62 near Parker, AZ was renamed "Wyatt Earp, California" after Earp's death in 1930 with a ZIP code of 92242. For amusement only there is a tiny cemetery showing the fake grave of Wyatt Earp (his actual grave is in the Hills of Eternity Cemetery in Colma, just south of San Francisco).

The entire region on the California side falls under area code 760.

Unofficial alternate names of the area are listed as Big River, Drenna and Drennan.

Since Earp is an unincorporated community of San Bernardino County, County CEO Leonard X. Hernandez would be considered the Chief Administrator of Earp.

Images of Earp
These are images of the area where the Earp Post Office is located. Included is the symbolic cemetery dedicated to Wyatt Earp.

References

External links and references
Map and GPS coordinates

Populated places established in 1906
Ghost towns in California
Unincorporated communities in San Bernardino County, California
Lower Colorado River Valley
Unincorporated communities in California
1906 establishments in California